Radoslav Dimitrov Pantaleev (born 5 July 1993) is a Bulgarian boxer.

He won a medal at the 2019 AIBA World Boxing Championships.

References

1993 births
Living people
Bulgarian male boxers
Sportspeople from Sofia
AIBA World Boxing Championships medalists
Heavyweight boxers
European Games competitors for Bulgaria
Boxers at the 2015 European Games
Boxers at the 2019 European Games